is a former Japanese footballer. He played as a midfielder for Japan national team.

Club career
Kobayashi was born in São Paulo, Brazil on November 29, 1947. He moved to Japan and joined Yanmar Diesel in 1971. The club won the league championship in 1971, 1974, and 1975. The club also won the 1974 Emperor's Cup. He retired in 1976. He played 92 games and scored 7 goals in the league. He was selected Best Eleven in 1974 and 1975.

National team career
On July 16, 1972, Kobayashi debuted for Japan national team against Sri Lanka. He played 3 games for Japan in 1972.

National team statistics

Awards
 Japan Soccer League Best Eleven: 1974, 1975

References

External links
 
 Japan National Football Team Database

1947 births
Living people
Association football midfielders
Brazilian people of Japanese descent
Brazilian emigrants to Japan
Japanese footballers
Japan international footballers
Japan Soccer League players
Cerezo Osaka players